Swaraj Round or Thrissur Round is the local name for a circular road which is about 2 km long in the centre of the city of Thrissur in Kerala, India, surrounding the   hillock called the Thekkinkadu Maidan which seats the Vadakkumnathan Temple. Swaraj Round is the biggest Roundabout in South Asia. It is a financial, commercial and business center in Kerala. Seventeen roads connect to it. Encircling the Thekkinkadu Maidan, Swaraj Round surrounds the small hillock on which the Vadakkunnathan Temple dedicated to Shiva is built. It is the largest circular road surrounding a ground in India and the second largest roundabout in the world.

Swaraj Round is a commercial and shopping area of Thrissur with malls, shopping centers, and jewelry and textile shops. There are two pedestrian subways in the Swaraj Round, one near Paramekkavu temple and other at M.O. Road Junction. The Swaraj Round is the location of the Republic parade and the Pulikali on the fourth Onam day, when Pulikali troupes from different parts of the district perform there.

References

Shopping districts and streets in India